The following is a list of match officials (referees, assistant referees, and video assistant referees) who officiated at the 2018 FIFA World Cup.

Referees and assistant referees
On 29 March 2018, FIFA published the list of 36 referees and 63 assistant referees, on the basis of nationality, from all six football confederations for the 2018 FIFA World Cup. These were selected from a longlist of 53 trios.

Out of these, one referee and one assistant referee were dropped from the list and were not replaced. The two assistant referees associated with the dropped referee also withdrew, but were replaced in the roster.

On 12 July 2018, FIFA announced that Argentine referee Néstor Pitana would take charge of the final.

Video assistant referees
On 30 April 2018, FIFA announced 13 video assistant referees (VARs) had been appointed. For each World Cup game, there will be one VAR and three AVARs (Assistant Video Assistant Referees), each responsible for different situations. They will be supporting the main referee from the Video Operation Room based at the International Broadcast Centre (IBC) in Moscow.

Referees withdrawn and replaced
Referee Fahad Al-Mirdasi (Saudi Arabia) was withdrawn due to attempted match-fixing at the 2018 King Cup Final. His assistant referees were also withdrawn:
Mohammed Al-Abakry (Saudi Arabia)
Abdulah Al-Shalwai (Saudi Arabia)

No referee was called up to replace Al-Mirdasi, but two assistant referees were called up to complete the referee teams of Mohammed Abdulla Hassan Mohamed (United Arab Emirates) and Ryuji Sato (Japan), respectively:
Hasan Al Mahri (United Arab Emirates)
Hiroshi Yamauchi (Japan)

Assistant referee Marwa Range (Kenya) also withdrew after the BBC released an investigation conducted by a Ghanaian journalist which implicated Marwa in a bribery scandal.

References

External links
FIFA World Cup Russia 2018: List of match officials

Officials